Abraham Acton VC (17 December 1893 – 16 May 1915) was an English recipient of the Victoria Cross, the highest and most prestigious award for gallantry in the face of the enemy that can be awarded to British and Commonwealth forces.

Biography
Acton was born on 17 December 1893 to Robert and Elizabeth Eleanor Acton, of 4 Regent Square, Senhouse Street, Whitehaven in Cumberland.

He was 21 years old, and a private in the 2nd Battalion, The Border Regiment, British Army during the First World War. He and James Alexander Smith, were both awarded their Victoria Cross for their actions on 21 December 1914 at Rouges Bancs, France.

He was killed in action at Festubert, France, on 16 May 1915, but his body was never found - he is commemorated on the Le Touret Memorial.

His Victoria Cross is displayed at The Beacon, Whitehaven, Cumbria, England.

References

Monuments to Courage (David Harvey, 1999)
The Register of the Victoria Cross (This England, 1997)
VCs of the First World War - 1914 (Gerald Gliddon, 1994)

External links
Location of Abraham Acton's Victoria Cross The Beacon, Whitehaven*
The Regimental Museum 

1893 births
1915 deaths
British World War I recipients of the Victoria Cross
Border Regiment soldiers
British Army personnel of World War I
British military personnel killed in World War I
People from Whitehaven
British Army recipients of the Victoria Cross